Charles Richard Shyer (born October 11, 1951) is an American film director, screenwriter and producer. Shyer's films are predominantly comedies, often with a romantic-comedy overtone. His films include Private Benjamin (1980), Irreconcilable Differences (1984), Baby Boom (1987), Father of the Bride (1991), and Father of the Bride Part II (1995), The Parent Trap (1998), The Affair of the Necklace (L'Affaire du Collier) (2001), Alfie (2004), and Ieri, Oggi Domani (Yesterday, Today and Tomorrow) (2012), 'The Noel Diary' (2022).

Early life
Shyer was born in Los Angeles, the son of Lois (née Jones) Delaney and Melville Shyer, a production executive and film director. Shyer grew up in the film industry where his father worked with D.W. Griffith and was one of the founders of the Directors Guild of America.  After attending UCLA, he was accepted into the DGA's apprenticeship program, which led to work as an assistant director. However, Shyer's focus was soon diverted to writing and he went to work as an assistant to Garry Marshall and Jerry Belson, producers of the TV series The Odd Couple. He eventually worked his way up to Head Writer and Associate Producer on the popular series in the early seventies. He is of Jewish descent.

Career
After The Odd Couple, Shyer transitioned into feature films and received his first writing credit on Smokey and the Bandit (1977), starring Burt Reynolds. The following year, Shyer co-wrote Goin' South, directed by and starring Jack Nicholson, and received his first Writers Guild of America nomination for Best Screenplay for the Walter Matthau/Glenda Jackson film "House Calls" (1978).

In 1979, Shyer teamed up with Nancy Meyers and Harvey Miller to write and produce Private Benjamin, starring Goldie Hawn in the Oscar-nominated lead role of Private Judy Benjamin. Contrary to the conventional wisdom at the time, that a female lead with no male star was box office poison, this story of a pampered young woman who joins the Army was a box office success. Receiving positive reviews from critics and ranking number one at the box office its opening weekend, Private Benjamin went on to gross nearly seventy million dollars within the US and over one hundred million worldwide.  The screenplay for Private Benjamin won Shyer, Meyers and Miller the Writers Guild of America Award for Best Original Comedy and was nominated for an Academy Award in the Best Original Screenplay category. The film was also nominated for multiple Golden Globe Awards, including Best Picture and Best Actress.

Shyer's next project, Irreconcilable Differences, marked his directorial debut. Shelley Long and Ryan O'Neal played a Hollywood couple whose obsession with success destroys their relationship with their daughter, played by an eight-year-old Drew Barrymore. Critics praised the film's even-handed treatment of both main characters and its sensitive updating of 1930s comedy style. Irreconcilable Differences received multiple Golden Globe nominations, including Best Actress nods for Long and Barrymore.

Shyer's 1987 film Baby Boom, like Private Benjamin, dealt with the role of women in a changing, feminist-influenced world, all in the form of a romantic comedy. Diane Keaton played J.C. Wiatt, a high-powered executive who unexpectedly finds herself saddled with a baby. The film was nominated for a Golden Globe Award as Best Motion Picture – Musical or Comedy; and Keaton was also nominated as Best Actress – Motion Picture Musical or Comedy.

In 1991, Meyers and Shyer, working from earlier material for the first time, remade the 1950 Vincente Minnelli Father of the Bride with Shyer directing. Father of the Bride received positive reviews from critics, including The New York Times' Janet Maslin's statement, “["Father of the Bride"] has been successfully refurbished with new jokes and new attitudes, but the earlier film's most memorable moments have been preserved."  Steve Martin won acclaim for his performance of a father "losing" his daughter and his bank account at the same time.  Diane Keaton, Kimberly Williams, and Martin Short were also singled out for praise for their performances in a film that went on to become a major worldwide success.  Meyers and Shyer went on the write, produce, and direct the sequel, Father of the Bride Part II, with all the principal players returning.  As Touchstone Pictures' major attraction for the 1995 Christmas season, Father of the Bride, Part II opened number one at the box office and went on to gross in excess of $75 million within the U.S.

Shyer co-wrote and produced the Meyers-directed remake of The Parent Trap (1998). The Parent Trap became another worldwide success for the team, grossing over $65 million domestically.

Shyer next tackled a period drama, The Affair of the Necklace (L'Affaire du Collier), starring Hilary Swank, Adrien Brody and Simon Baker. The film featured lush cinematography, costumes and settings in the Czech Republic and France, and garnered an Academy-Award nomination for costume designer, Milena Canonero.

In 2004, Shyer wrote, directed and produced a remake of the 1966 film Alfie. Alfie starred Jude Law, Susan Sarandon and Sienna Miller in her first major role. In an interview with Culture.com, Shyer mentioned that he had not originally planned on doing another remake, but was convinced to work on the project by co-writer Elaine Pope.

In 2008, Shyer was announced to co-write, direct and produce a film adaptation of the 1950s children's book Eloise in Paris for HandMade Films, but the film project saw multiple delays and appears to have been put on hold.

In 2012, jewelry designer Liv Ballard premiered the online fashion film Ieri Oggi Domani (Yesterday, Today and Tomorrow), written and directed by Shyer in his first commercial endeavor. The fashion film has since won multiple awards, including two from the Internet Advertising Competition: "Best Fashion Online Advertisement" and "Best of Show 2012."

Shyer's next project is for Netflix - The Noel Diary starring Justin Hartley and based on the New York Times best-selling novel. Shyer co-wrote the screenplay and will direct for Christmas 2022.

Films

References

External links

1951 births
Living people
Film directors from Los Angeles
Film producers from California
Screenwriters from California
Television producers from California
Writers from Los Angeles
American male screenwriters
American male television writers
American people of German-Jewish descent
American television writers
Jewish American screenwriters
21st-century American Jews